This is a list of seasons completed by the Akron Zips football team.

Results

References

Akron Zips
Akron Zips football seasons